The Finnish national road 67 is the 2nd class main route from Kaskinen to Nurmo, which belongs to Seinäjoki. The road is 115 kilometers long and is mainly two-lane, except for the center of Seinäjoki, where the road is four-lane. The road is for the most part of good quality, in some places even highway, and its traffic volumes are quite variable.

In the 1996 road number reform, the main road section between Seinäjoki and Ytterjeppo was changed to Highway 19 and main road 67 was shortened to end at Seinäjoki. At the same time, however, the road continued from its western end to continue to Kaskinen.

Route

The road passes through the following localities:
Kaskinen
Närpes
Teuva
Kauhajoki
Kurikka
Ilmajoki
Seinäjoki

Sources

External links

Roads in Finland